The Crooked Lady is a 1932 British drama film directed by Leslie S. Hiscott and starring George Graves, Isobel Elsom, Ursula Jeans and Austin Trevor. A quota quickie, it was filmed at Twickenham Studios.

Cast
 George Graves as Sir Charles Murdoch  
 Isobel Elsom as Miriam Sinclair 
 Ursula Jeans as Joan Collinson  
 Austin Trevor as Captain James Kent  
 Alexander Field as Slim Barrett  
 Edmund Willard as Joseph Garstin  
 S. J. Warmington as Inspector Hilton  
 Frank Pettingell as Hugh Weldon  
 Moore Marriott as Crabby 
 Henry B. Longhurst as John Morland  
 Paddy Browne  as Susie

Plot

An ex army officer is forced to resort to a life of crime.

References

Bibliography
 Chibnall, Steve. Quota Quickies: The Birth of the British 'B' Film. British Film Institute, 2007.
 Low, Rachael. Filmmaking in 1930s Britain. George Allen & Unwin, 1985.
 Wood, Linda. British Films, 1927-1939. British Film Institute, 1986.

External links
 

1932 films
British crime drama films
British detective films
1932 crime drama films
1930s English-language films
Films directed by Leslie S. Hiscott
British black-and-white films
1930s British films